Liu'ao may refer to:

 Liu'ao, Zhangpu County (六鳌镇), town in Fujian, China
 Liu'ao, Sanmen County (六敖镇), town in Zhejiang, China